John Arthur Markle (May 15, 1907 – June 25, 1956) was a Canadian professional ice hockey player who played eight games in the National Hockey League with the Toronto Maple Leafs during the 1935–36 season. The rest of his career, which lasted from 1927 to 1940, was spent in various minor leagues. He was born in Thessalon, Ontario.

Career statistics

Regular season and playoffs

External links
 

1907 births
1956 deaths
Canadian ice hockey right wingers
Hamilton Tigers (CPHL) players
Hamilton Tigers (IHL) players
Ice hockey people from Ontario
London Panthers players
Owen Sound Greys players
People from Algoma District
Syracuse Stars (AHL) players
Syracuse Stars (IHL) players
Toronto Maple Leafs players